The Buddhist caves in India. Maharashtra state Aurangabad Dist. Ellora caves form an important part of Indian rock-cut architecture, and are among the most prolific examples of rock-cut architecture around the world. There are more than 1,500 known rock cut structures in India, out of which about 1000 were made by Buddhists (mainly between 200 BCE and 600 CE), 300 by Hindus (from 600 CE to 1200 CE), and 200 by Jains (from 800 CE to 1200 CE). Many of these structures contain works of art of global importance, and many later caves from the Mahayana period are adorned with exquisite stone carvings. These ancient and medieval structures represent significant achievements of structural engineering and craftsmanship.

In India, caves have long been regarded as places of sanctity. Caves that were enlarged or entirely man-made were felt to hold the same sanctity as natural caves. In fact, the sanctuary in all Indian religious structures, even free-standing ones, retains the same cave-like feeling of sacredness, being small and dark without natural light.

The oldest rock-cut architecture in India is found in the Barabar caves, Bihar  built around the 3rd century BCE. Of these caves, mostly build by Emperor Ashoka and his grandson Dasaratha for the ascetic sect of the Ajivikas, two caves are thought to have been dedicated to the Buddhist: Karan Chaupar cave, and possibly the Lomas Rishi cave. Most other Buddhist caves are then found in the western Deccan, consisting in shrines and monasteries, dating between 100 BCE and 170 CE. Originally, they were probably accompanied by wooden structures, which would have deteriorated over time. Historically, rock-cut temples have retained a wood-like theme in adornment; skilled craftsmen learned to mimic timber texture, grain, and structure. The earliest cave temples include the Bhaja Caves, the Karla Caves, the Bedse Caves, the Kanheri Caves, and some of the Ajanta Caves. Relics found in these caves suggest a connection between the religious and the commercial, as Buddhist missionaries often accompanied traders on the busy international trading routes through India. Some of the more sumptuous cave temples, commissioned by wealthy traders, included pillars, arches, and elaborate facades during the time maritime trade boomed between the Roman Empire and south-east Asia.

Although free standing structural temples were also being built, such as the Bairat Temple (3rd century BCE) and the various free-standing apsidal temples in Sanchi, Taxila or Ter, rock-cut cave temples continued to be built in parallel. Later rock-cut cave architecture became more sophisticated as in the Ajanta Caves, belonging to a second, and last, wave of Buddhist cave building. The last Buddhist caves were built around the 6th century CE.

Architecture 

Architectural elements are borrowed from:
 Indian rock-cut architecture
 Buddhist temple architecture
 Buddhist architecture

Early natural caves

The earliest caves employed by humans were natural caves used by local inhabitants for a variety of purposes, such as shrines and shelters. Evidence suggests that the caves were first occupied and slightly altered during the Palaeolithic and Mesolithic periods, up to about 6000 BC, though the changes do not really amount to architecture. Early examples included overhanging rock decorated with rock-cut designs. The Rock Shelters of Bhimbetka, a World Heritage Site, are located on the edge of the Deccan Plateau, where dramatic erosion has left massive sandstone outcrops. The area's many caves and grottos have yielded primitive tools and decorative rock paintings.

During the time of the Buddha (c. 563/480 or c. 483/400 BCE), Buddhist monks were also in the habit of using natural caves, such as the Saptaparni Cave, southwest from Rajgir, Bihar. Many believe it to be the site in which Buddha spent some time before his death, and where the first Buddhist council was held after the Buddha died (paranirvana). The Buddha himself had also used the Indrasala Cave for meditation, starting a tradition of using caves, natural or man-made, as religious retreats, that would last for over a millennium.

Saru Maru transition
 
Natural caves continued to be used for a long time, and over a rather wide area, as shown by the Saru Maru caves (also known as Pangoraria or Budhani caves) in Madhya Pradesh. More than 45 rock shelters were found in the Pangaroria area, which is a Buddhist site with multiple stupas and dwellings. Ashoka came here as a young prince when he was governor of the northwest, based in Vidisha, as shown by a commemorative inscription in one of the two natural caves. He later also had his Minor Rock Edict in the second cave at Saru Maru.

According to Gupta, the Saru Maru caves also display a certain level of man-made improvements, such as the creation of rock-cut steps and benches for monks. This possibly is a preliminary step before the advent, under Ashoka, of full-fledged artificial caves, such as those of Barabar. The Saru-Maru caves may present an evolutionary step between fully natural Buddhist caves of east India, and the highly sophisticated fully artificial, rock-cut, caves that appeared at Barabar circa 250 BCE.

Alternatively, it has been suggested that the next stage of artificial caves building at Barabar was such a remarkable feat of engineering, with the use of large-scale polishing techniques without precedents in the history of India, that they were probably due to foreign influence, and derived from the stone-working techniques of the Achaemenids, having spread to India after the destruction of the empire by Alexander the Great in 330 BCE and the displacement of Persian and Perso-Greek artists and technicians.

Artificial caves of Eastern India (3rd-2nd centuries BCE)

In the 3rd century BCE Indian rock-cut architecture began to develop, starting with the already highly sophisticated and state-sponsored Barabar caves in Bihar, personally dedicated by Ashoka to the ascetic sect of the Ajivikas circa 250 BCE. The precise identity of the Ajivikas is not well known, and it is even unclear if they were a divergent sect of the Buddhists or the Jains. These artificial caves exhibit an amazing level of technical proficiency, the extremely hard granite rock being cut in geometrical fashion and polished to a mirror-like finish.

There is another cave with the structure and polishing qualities of the Barabar caves, but without any inscription. This is the Sitamarhi Cave, 20 km from Rajgir, 10 km south-west of Hisua, also dated of the Maurya empire. It is smaller than the Barabar caves, measuring only 4.91x3.43m, with a ceiling height of 2.01m. The entrance is also trapezoidal, as for the Barabar caves.

The caves were carved out of granite, an extremely hard rock, then finished with a very nice polishing of the inner surface, giving a mirror effect of a great regularity, as well as an echo effect. This large-scale polish is reminiscent of polishing on smaller surfaces of the Maurya statuary, particularly visible on the pillars and capitals of the Ashoka pillars.

Commenting of Mauryan sculpture, John Marshall once wrote about the "extraordinary precision and accuracy which characterizes all Mauryan works, and which has never, we venture to say, been surpassed even by the finest workmanship on Athenian buildings".

This know-how seems to have disappeared again after the Maurya period, none of the later caves such as the Ajanta caves having this characteristic of polished surfaces. The very act of digging artificial caves in the rock, of which the Barabar caves represent the oldest case in India, was probably inspired by the caves dug in the rock of the Achaemenids, as is the case in Naqsh-e Rostam.

Imperial sponsorship

These remarkable caves were conceived under the Imperial sponsorship of Ashoka and his grandson Dasaratha Maurya. The cost involved in the rock-cutting and the refined polishing work was probably enormous, and was never replicated again in subsequent caves. Ashoka dedicated the caves of Sudama and Visvakarma to the Ajivikas in the 12th year of his reign, when his religious evolution towards Buddhism was not yet fully completed. Later, Ashoka built the caves of Lomas Rishi (without dated inscription, but posterior to Sudama on architectural grounds) and Karna Chopar (19th year of his reign), at a time when he had become a firm advocate of Buddhism, as known from the Edicts of Ashoka. Therefore, he may naturally have offered the last two caves of Lomas Rishi and Karna Chopar to the Buddhists, although the former has no inscription and the latter has an inscription which only indirectly suggests that.  Ashoka's inscription from Karna Chopar Cave does not mention the Ajivikas, and seems rather to refer to the Buddhist practice of retirement during the rainy season. In addition, the inverted swastika with upward arrow at the end of the inscription would be more of a Buddhist character. It is therefore probable that this cave was planned for Buddhist monks.

The affiliation of the last two caves to Buddhism would be coherent with the fact that the architecture of the gate of Lomas Rishi became a reference for the development of the Chaitya arch in Buddhist cave architecture for the following centuries, whereas the Hindus or the Jains caves essentially did not follow this architectural example. This would also mean that the decorated gate of Lomas Rishi was a Buddhist invention, which was emulated in Buddhist architecture in the following centuries.

Artificial caves of Western India

After the Barabar caves, the earliest known rock-cut Buddhist monasteries date to the 1st century BCE in the Western Ghats in western India. Huge efforts were made at building religious caves in Western India until the 6th century CE. However, the polishing of cave walls was abandoned, never to be revived. Such grandiose caves as Karla Caves (1st century CE) or the Ajanta Caves (5th century CE) do not have any polishing either. This may be due to the fact that Mauryan caves where dedicated and sponsored by the Mauryan Imperial government, allowing for huge resources and efforts to be spent, whereas later caves were essentially the result of donations by commoners, who could not afford as high a level of spending.

First wave of construction (2nd century BCE- 2nd century CE)
Probably owing to the 2nd century BCE fall of the Mauryan Empire and the subsequent persecutions of Buddhism under Pushyamitra Sunga, it is thought that many Buddhists relocated to the Deccan under the protection of the Andhra dynasty, thus shifting the cave-building effort to western India: an enormous effort at creating religious caves (usually Buddhist or Jain) continued there until the 2nd century CE, culminating with the Karla Caves or the Pandavleni Caves. These caves generally followed an apsidal plan with a stupa in the back for the chaityas, and a rectangular plan with surrounding cells for the viharas.

When Buddhist missionaries arrived, they naturally gravitated to caves for use as temples and abodes, in accord with their religious ideas of asceticism and the monastic life. The Western Ghats topography, with its flat-topped basalt hills, deep ravines, and sharp cliffs, was suited to their cultural inclinations.

First western artificial vihara caves (100-70 BCE)

Several simple viharas started to be cut in the rock, such as Cave 19 of the Nasik Caves. It is a small Vihara, 14 feet 3 inches square, with six cells, two on each side; their doors are surmounted by the Chaitya-arch ornament connected by a frieze of "rail pattern" in some places wavy. In the front wall are two lattice windows, and in the veranda two slender square pillars, the middle portion of the shaft being chamfered to an octagonal shape. The cave is exceedingly plain in style, and the remarkable rectangularity of all its parts, agree perfectly with what might be expected in a Vihara of the first or second century BCE. Its close family likeness to Cave No.12 at Ajanta and others at Bhaja and Kondane, all of the earliest age, suggest about the same date. The earliest of the Kanheri Caves were excavated in the 1st and 2nd centuries B.C., as were those at Ajanta, which were occupied continuously by Buddhist monks from 200 BCE to 650 AD. As the Buddhist ideology encouraged involvement in trade, monasteries often became stopovers for inland traders and provided lodging houses along trade routes.

Cave No.19 at the Nasik Caves has one inscription of king Krishna of the Satavahanas, which is the oldest known Satavahana inscription, dated to 100-70 BCE

Rock-cut chaityas halls
Facades were added to the exteriors while the interiors became designated for specific uses, such as monasteries (viharas)  and worship halls (chaityas). Over the centuries, simple caves began to resemble free-standing buildings, needing to be formally designed and requiring highly skilled artisans and craftsmen to complete. These artisans had not forgotten their timber roots and imitated the nuances of a wooden structure and the wood grain in working with stone.

The earliest rock-cut chaityas, similar to free-standing ones, consisted of an inner circular chamber with pillars to create a circular path around the stupa and an outer rectangular hall for the congregation of the devotees. Over the course of time, the wall separating the stupa from the hall was removed to create an apsidal hall with a colonnade around the nave and the stupa.

The chaitya at Bhaja Caves is perhaps the earliest surviving chaitya hall, constructed in the second century BCE. It consists of an apsidal hall with stupa. The columns slope inwards in the imitation of wooden columns that would have been structurally necessary to keep a roof up. The ceiling is barrel vaulted with ancient wooden ribs set into them. The walls are polished in the Mauryan style. It was faced by a substantial wooden facade, now entirely lost. A large horseshoe-shaped window, the chaitya-window, was set above the arched doorway and the whole portico-area was carved to imitate a multi-storeyed building with balconies and windows and sculptured men and women who observed the scene below. This created the appearance of an ancient Indian mansion.  This, like a similar facade at the Bedse Caves is an early example of what James Fergusson noted in the nineteenth century: "Everywhere ... in India architectural decoration is made up of small models of large buildings".

Maturity

As mercantile and royal endowments grew, cave interiors became more elaborate, with interior walls decorated in paintings, reliefs, and intricate carvings. Numerous donors provided the funds for the building of these caves and left donatory inscriptions, including laity, members of the clergy, government officials, and even foreigners such as Yavanas (Greeks) representing about 8% of all inscriptions. The Indo-Scythian dynasty of the Western Satraps too sponsored numerous Buddhist caves, as seen from their dedications at Karla Caves, Manmodi Caves or Nasik Caves. The Great Chaitya of the Karla Caves, the largest in South Asia, was constructed and dedicated in 120 CE by the Western Satraps ruler Nahapana. When the Satavahanas recovered lost territory from the Western Satraps, they again pursued construction efforts as seen in Nasik Caves and Kanheri Caves.

Although many temples, monasteries and stupas have been destroyed, by contrast cave temples are very well preserved as they are both less visible and therefore less vulnerable to vandalism as well as made of more durable material than wood and masonry. There are around 1200 cave temples still in existence, most of which are Buddhist. The residences of monks were called Viharas and the cave shrines, called Chaityas, were for congregational worship. The earliest rock-cut garbhagriha, similar to free-standing ones later, had an inner circular chamber with pillars to create a circumambulatory path (pradakshina) around the stupa and an outer rectangular hall for the congregation of the devotees.

Gallery

Second wave of cave construction (5th-6th century CE)

The construction of caves would wane after the 2nd century CE, possibly due to the rise of Mahayana Buddhism and the associated intense architectural and artistic production in Gandhara and Amaravati. The building of rock-cut caves would revive briefly in the 6th century CE, with the magnificent achievements of Ajanta and Ellora, before finally subsiding as Hinduism replaced Buddhism in the sub-continent, and stand-alone temples became more prevalent.

The Ajanta Caves in Maharashtra, a World Heritage Site, are 30 rock-cut cave Buddhist temples carved into the sheer vertical side of a gorge near a waterfall-fed pool located in the hills of the Sahyadri mountains. Like all the locations of Buddhist caves, this one is located near main trade routes and spans six centuries beginning in the 2nd or 1st century B.C. A period of intense building activity at this site occurred under the Vakataka king Harisena between 460 and 478 A profuse variety of decorative sculpture, intricately carved columns and carved reliefs are found, including exquisitely carved cornices and pilaster. Skilled artisans crafted living rock to imitate timbered wood (such as lintels) in construction and grain and intricate decorative carving, although such architectural elements were ornamental and not functional in the classical sense.

Later many Hindu kings from southern India patronize many cave temples dedicated to Hindu gods and goddesses. One such prominent example of cave temple architecture are the Badami Cave Temples at Badami, the early Chalukya capital, carved out in the 6th century. There are four cave temples hewn from the sides of cliffs, three Hindu and one Jain, that contain carved architectural elements such as decorative pillars and brackets as well as finely carved sculpture and richly etched ceiling panels. Nearby are many small Buddhist cave shrines.

References

 
Rock-cut
Rock-cut